Nungi is a neighbourhood in the Maheshtala of the South 24 Parganas district in the Indian state of West Bengal. It is a part of the area covered by the Kolkata Metropolitan Development Authority (KMDA).

Geography

Area overview
Alipore Sadar subdivision is the most urbanized part of the South 24 Parganas district. 59.85% of the population lives in the urban areas and 40.15% lives in the rural areas. In the northern portion of the subdivision (shown in the map alongside) there are 21 census towns. The entire district is situated in the Ganges Delta and the subdivision, on the east bank of the Hooghly River, is an alluvial stretch, with industrial development.

Note: The map alongside presents some of the notable locations in the subdivision. All places marked in the map are linked in the larger full screen map.

Location

Economy
Located near the industrial locality of the Batanagar, shoe making is a common cottage industry in Nungi, with families manufacturing shoes for brands that have out-sourced labour, including Khadim's, SreeLeathers, and Liberty. Nungi once had a thriving fireworks industry and the "Chocolate Bomb" from Nungi market remains well known during the Diwali festival. In 2007 a joint development project was announced involving the London-based company REIT Asset Management, Eden Realty Ventures Private Limited, a Bengali NRI and the Mahestala Municipality. The project, known as the Maheshtala project, involved the development of a mini township near Nangi railway station.

Transport
Nungi is on the Budge Budge Trunk Road.

Nangi railway station is on the Sealdah–Budge Budge line of the Kolkata Suburban Railway system.

Commuters
With the electrification of the railways, suburban traffic has grown tremendously since the 1960s. As of 2005-06, more than 1.7 million (17 lakhs) commuters use the Kolkata Suburban Railway system daily. After the partition of India, refugees from East Pakistan/ Bangladesh had a strong impact on the development of urban areas in the periphery of Kolkata. The new immigrants depended on Kolkata for their livelihood, thus increasing the number of commuters. Eastern Railway runs 1,272 EMU trains daily.

Education
Nangi High School is a Bengali-medium school for boys. It was established in 1947 and has facilities for teaching from class V to class XII.

Nangi Balika Bidyalay Up High School is a Bengali-medium school for girls. It was established in 1948 and has facilities for teaching from class V to class XII.

References

External links
 

Neighbourhoods in Kolkata
Cities and towns in South 24 Parganas district
Kolkata Metropolitan Area